Southbridge is an unincorporated master-planned community of over 1,500 homes with more than 5,000 residents located in Prince William County, Virginia. It is situated on over  near the Potomac River on the Cherry Hill peninsula just north of the Town of Dumfries.

History
Founded in 1990, Southbridge features a private swim and racquet club with pools, tennis courts, tot lots, and a nature trail. Southbridge’s adjacent sister community, Potomac Shores, has built an 18-hole Signature golf course designed by Jack Nicklaus.

These communities are also home to John Paul the Great Catholic High School which opened August 25, 2008. Pope John Paul the Great Catholic High School is in the Diocese of Arlington. The new  campus will eventually have a capacity of 1000 students.

Southbridge is located near Interstate 95 and State Route 234 (the Ronald Wilson Reagan Memorial Highway), just off U.S. Route 1, providing access to Washington, D.C.  to the north and the rest of Northern Virginia.

A Virginia Railway Express station is set to open at Cherry Hill once track work is completed. Swans Creek Elementary School, located within the confines of Southbridge, is part of the Prince William County Public School System.

The U.S. Postal Service has deemed that residents may use "Southbridge, VA" as their mailing address, sharing the 22026 ZIP code with the Town of Dumfries.  In addition, the Virginia Department of Motor Vehicles allows residents to select "Southbridge, VA" as their legal residence for their driver's license and vehicle registration.

Southbridge is governed by the Southbridge Community Association, which retains Cardinal Management Group as its on-site property manager.  Residents are represented on the Southbridge Community Association by a nine-member Board of Directors.  Each year, three directors are elected to a three-year term on the board.  In the event that a vacancy occurs before the expiration of a director's term, an individual is appointed by the remaining directors to fill the seat until the next association annual meeting at which time an election is held for the remainder of the unexpired term.

The current members of the Board of Directors are:

Nick Antonetti, President (term expires 2017);
Doug Thornton, Vice President (term expires 2015);
Rob Hicks, Treasurer (term expires 2015);
Rich Inlow, Secretary (term expires 2016);
Candy Arthur, Director (term expires 2016);
John Letsen, Director (term expires 2017)
Michael Mumford, Director (term expires 2017);
Jim Riley, Director (term expires 2015); and
Matt Webb, Director (term expires 2016).

Southbridge celebrated its 20th anniversary in 2010.

Geography

Southbridge is located at 38°34'33" North, 77°17'58" West (38.5759, −77.299633).

Census data
Southbridge is part of the Cherry Hill census-designated place. As of the 2010 census, the CDP had a total population of 16,000.

References

External links
Official Website of Prince William County
Southbridge, VA Website
U.S. Census Data for Southbridge, VA
Additional Census Data for ZIP Code 22026 as of 2005
The Southbridge Sentinel
Southbridge, VA Yahoo! Group
The Southbridge on the Potomac Republican Club
Prince William Conservation Alliance

Unincorporated communities in Prince William County, Virginia
Unincorporated communities in Virginia
Washington metropolitan area
Populated places established in 1990
1990 establishments in Virginia